Stipanović is a surname found among the Croats, and more rarely among the Serbs. It is a patronymic of the name Stipan. The anglicized form is Stipanovich.

Notable people with the surname include:

 Andrija Stipanović (born 1986), Bosnian-Herzegovinian basketball player
 Dušan Stipanović (born 1956), Serbian politician
 Tonči Stipanović (born 1986), Croatian sailor
 Predrag Stipanović (born 1964), Croatian admiral

See also
 Stipanić
 Stipančević

Croatian surnames
Serbian surnames